Axel and Valborg is a tragedy in five acts by Adam Oehlenschläger. It was written in Paris in 1808 and printed in Copenhagen in 1810. There is an English translation by F. S. Kolle.

Origin of story
The story is taken from a Danish romantic ballad, the last verse of which Oehlenschläger used as a motto:

The ballad was well known throughout the Scandinavian countries long before Oehlenschläger's time. In Ludvig Holberg's poem “Peder Paars,” the bailiff's wife was almost drowned in a flood of tears because parts of it had been read to her.

Plot
The whole action of the drama takes place in the famous Trondhjem Cathedral, in Norway, during the reign of Haakon Herdebred. Axel and Valborg are cousins who love each other. In spite of the pope's dispensation removing the legal impediment, a scheming monk prevents their marriage. In this tragedy of a Northern woman's true and constant devotion, the beauty of the ballad is brought to its full fruition. In its simplicity, its pathos and tragic ending, it makes an almost overwhelming impression on the spectator. (Compare it with Bjørnstjerne Bjørnson's The Fisher Maiden.)

Reception
In his own generation, Oehlenschläger's Axel and Valborg was the most favored and admired of all his writings. Through it, the romantic-sentimental style of poetry gained general favor. When Baggesen, beginning his review in a critical and hostile spirit, reached the famous lines spoken by the pure and innocent Valborg, as she crowns her lover's initials with flowers: “I bid thee, my love, good morning,” he was absolutely carried away and praised the work in the highest terms.

Selected productions

Dagmar Theatre, 1907
A production of the play directed by Martinius Nielsen premiered at the Dagmar Theatre in Copenhagen on 22 November 1906. The cast consisted of :
 Adam Poulsen as Axel Thordsøn
 Alfred Møller as Biørn Gamle
 Anna Larssen as Valborg
 Axel Strøm as Erland, Erkebiskop
 Egill Rostrup as Hakon Herdebred, Norges konge
 Einar Rosenbaum as Gotfred, Vilhelms svend
 Johan Knüttel-Petersen as	Fjendtlig kæmpe
 Johannes Poulsen as Vilhelm
 Knud Levinsen as Kolbein
 Martinius Nielsen as Sortebroder
 Viggo Wiehe as Sigurd af Reire
 Aage Hertel as Endrid hiin Unge

References

External link

Plays by Adam Oehlenschläger
19th-century Danish plays
1808 plays
Plays set in Norway
Plays set in the 12th century
Literary duos
Fictional Norwegian people